In military terminology, a demolition belt is a selected land area sown with explosive charges, mines, and other available obstacles to deny use of the land to enemy operations, and as a protection to friendly troops. 

There are two types of demolition belt:
 A primary demolition belt is a continuous series of obstacles across the whole front, selected by the division or higher commander. The preparation of such a belt is normally a priority engineer task.
 A subsidiary demolition belt is a supplement to the primary belt to give depth in front or behind or to protect the flanks.

See also 

Camouflet
Land mine

References
	

Area denial weapons
Force protection tactics
Military terminology of the United States